Raymond "Ray" Dring (13 February 1924 - October 2003) is a former professional footballer who played as a goalkeeper for Huddersfield Town. He was born in Lincoln.

References
 Alan Hodgson - Huddersfield Town F.C. Matchday Programme - 2007-08 season
England and Wales, Death Registration Index 1837-2007

1924 births
2003 deaths
Sportspeople from Lincoln, England
English footballers
Association football goalkeepers
English Football League players
Huddersfield Town A.F.C. players
Colchester United F.C. players
Place of birth missing